Samuel Rosenstein may refer to:

 Samuel Murray Rosenstein (1909–1995), judge for the United States Customs Court
 Samuel Siegmund Rosenstein (1832–1906), German physician